Kamruddin Ahia Khan Majlish (died 29 June 2020) was a politician of the Bangladesh Nationalist Party. He was a two-time Jatiya Sangsad member representing the Sirajganj-7 constituency and a member of the BNP Central Executive Committee.

Career 
Majlish was elected a member of parliament by participating in the 5th Parliamentary Elections held on 26 February 1991 and the 6th Parliamentary Elections on 15 February 1996. He was a chairman of Milk Vita Company, a director and chairman of Agrani Bank .

Personal life 
Majlish was born in Dargapara Mahalla of Shahjadpur municipality in Sirajganj district. His father was Maulana Chaifuddin Ehiya Khan.

Majlish died on 29 June 2020.

References 

1950s births
2020 deaths
Bangladesh Nationalist Party politicians
People from Sirajganj District
5th Jatiya Sangsad members
6th Jatiya Sangsad members
Date of birth missing